Planets is the third studio album by the American rock band Adema. This is Adema's first and only album with Luke Carracioli, who left the band on October 25, 2005, citing "personal differences". The album was released by Earache Records on April 5, 2005. It obtained a peak position of 152 on the Billboard 200 before falling off. The album featured three singles: "Tornado", "Shoot the Arrows", and the self-titled track "Planets". "Planets" also was featured in the movie Cry Wolf.

Track listing

Note: International (European) edition of Planets doesn't contain Bad Triangle, Lift Us Up or The Thing That Should Not Be.

Credits
Adema
 Luke Caraccioli - lead vocals
 Tim Fluckey - lead and rhythm guitars, piano, backing vocals
 Dave DeRoo - bass guitar, backing vocals
 Kris Kohls - drums, percussion

Additional Musician
Additional Vocals on "Bad Triangle" by Rio Life

Production
 Planets Produced and Mixed by Adema and Nick Forcillo
 Engineered by Nick Forcillo
 Recorded and Mixed at Fattracks/Pig Studios, Oildale, CA
 Mastered by Tom Baker at Precision Mastering, Hollywood, CA
 Drum Technician and Assistance: Mark Deleon
 Equipment Rental: Pacwest Sound, Bakersfield, CA
 Art Direction & Design: Asterik Studio, Seattle, WA
 Photography by Alex Solca
 A&R: Al Dawson
 Legal: The Law Offices of Terri L. DiPaolo Esq.
 Business Management: Wayne Kamemoto at Gudvi, Sussman, & Oppenheim
 Management: Kevin Lee and Novi Entertainment
 Design by Chris Amendola at O.C. Logic

References

Adema albums
2005 albums
Earache Records albums